Park Blocks may refer to:

 North Park Blocks, Portland, Oregon
 Park Blocks (Eugene, Oregon)
 South Park Blocks, Portland, Oregon